Resilient is the fifteenth studio album by Running Wild, released on 4 October 2013 via Steamhammer Records.

Track listing

Album Information
In a 2013 interview, Rolf Kasparek described the album as audibly tougher and more compact than the previous album Shadowmaker. He then went on to talk about the song "Bloody Island" in which he explained that the demo version of the song would've been a great fit on their Pile of Skulls album.

Personnel
 Rolf Kasparek – vocals, guitars, bass
 Peter Jordan – guitars

Notes
 As with the previous album, the bass and drums were once again recorded by guests that wanted to remain anonymous
 A limited edition boxed set, released exclusively on the German Amazon website, features a poster flag, a patch, 2 posters, 2 stickers and a photo card

Production
 Rolf Kasparek - producer 
 Niki Nowy - mixing, mastering 
 Jens Reinhold - cover art

Charts

References

2013 albums
Running Wild (band) albums